That Wanaka Tree, also known as the Wanaka Willow, is a willow tree located at the southern end of Lake Wānaka in the Otago region of New Zealand. The tree sits alone in the water and is a popular destination for tourists to take Instagram photos. As a result of its popularity, That Wanaka Tree has been intentionally and unintentionally damaged on several occasions.

Popularity
That Wanaka Tree derives its name from the hashtag "#ThatWanakaTree", which is used on Instagram to identify photos of the tree. The tree has been described as "New Zealand's most famous tree" and called "one of the most photographed trees in all New Zealand." A photograph of the tree by Dennis Radermacher won the 2014 New Zealand Geographic photo of the year award.

Human impact

That Wanaka Tree has been damaged on several occasions, both intentionally and unintentionally. A branch came off the tree in late 2017 due to tourists climbing it, which led to the local tourism board installing signs discouraging the practice. The tree was vandalised on 18 March 2020, with multiple limbs being sawn off and left on the shore. Reports noted that the tree's limbs would likely be slow to grow back due to the cold water the tree's roots are submerged in. The human impact on the tree has been compared to that at other tourist attractions like Joshua Tree National Park and Uluru.

See also
 List of individual trees

References

Individual trees in New Zealand
Wānaka
Tourist attractions in Otago